Song Nan (born August 9, 1990) is a Chinese former competitive figure skater. He is the 2014 Four Continents bronze medalist, the 2013 Winter Universiade champion, the 2010 World Junior silver medalist, a two-time senior Grand Prix medalist, and a three-time Chinese national champion (2009, 2012, 2013).

Career 
Song started skating at age six. His parents put him in skating to improve his health. He lived and trained at Beijing's Capital Gymnasium Sports Complex, which includes dormitories.

In 2009–10, his final season as a junior, Song won two Junior Grand Prix (JGP) medals – silver in Belarus and gold in Germany – to qualify for the JGP Final. He won silver behind Yuzuru Hanyu at both the JGP Final and the 2010 World Junior Championships.

Song turned senior in 2010–11 and won the bronze medal at the 2011 Asian Winter Games. In the 2011–12 season, Song won two Grand Prix medals, bronze at the 2011 Cup of China and silver at the 2011 Trophee Eric Bompard. He was the first alternate for the Grand Prix Final.

Song withdrew from the 2012 Cup of China after sustaining a concussion in a collision with American skater Adam Rippon a minute into the final warm up before the free skate. Song was kept in the hospital overnight for observation. Although 14 days rest was recommended, he decided to compete at his next assignment, the 2012 Trophee Eric Bompard, finishing 5th. He then won the gold medal at the 2013 Chinese Championships.

In the 2013–14 season, Song won gold at the 2013 Winter Universiade and bronze at the 2014 Four Continents Championships.

Song had spondylopathy affecting his lower back in particular. He placed 9th at the 2015 Cup of China and 12th at the 2016 Four Continents Championships. He announced his retirement from competitive skating on April 4, 2016.

Programs

Competitive highlights

Detailed results

 At the 2009 Chinese Championships, Song scored 277.02 points overall because there was an additional interpretive segment in the competition.

References

External links 

1990 births
Living people
Chinese male single skaters
Sportspeople from Qiqihar
World Junior Figure Skating Championships medalists
Asian Games medalists in figure skating
Figure skaters at the 2011 Asian Winter Games
Medalists at the 2011 Asian Winter Games
Universiade medalists in figure skating
Asian Games bronze medalists for China
Universiade gold medalists for China
Competitors at the 2013 Winter Universiade
Figure skaters from Heilongjiang
Four Continents Figure Skating Championships medalists
Competitors at the 2015 Winter Universiade